Veronica stricta, synonym Hebe stricta, commonly called koromiko, is a flowering plant in the family Plantaginaceae, which is endemic to New Zealand.

Koromiko is a hebe found throughout the Mainland New Zealand, with long pale green leaves and tiny white flowers in summer formed into a dense inflorescence longer than the leaves. It is a hardy plant and does not tolerate shade.  It prefers full sun and open habitats on edge of bush and wetlands as it tolerates wet areas.

Taxonomy

Synonyms
, both Plants of the World Online and the Germplasm Resources Information Network (GRIN) accepted Hebe stricta as a synonym. In addition, GRIN listed:
 Hebe parkinsoniana (Colenso) Cockayne
 Hebe salicifolia var. angustissima (Cockayne) Cockayne & Allan
 Hebe salicifolia var. atkinsonii (Cockayne) Cockayne & Allan
 Hebe salicifolia var. stricta (Banks & Sol. ex Benth.) Cockayne & Allan
 Hebe stricta var. atkinsonii (Cockayne) L.B.Moore
 Veronica parkinsoniana Colenso
 Veronica salicifolia var. angustissima Cockayne
 Veronica salicifolia var. atkinsonii Cockayne
 Veronica salicifolia var. stricta (Banks & Sol. ex Benth.) Hook.f.

Varieties
, Plants of the World Online accepted four varieties:
 Veronica stricta var. egmontiana (L.B.Moore) Garn.-Jones
 Veronica stricta var. lata (L.B.Moore) Garn.-Jones
 Veronica stricta var. macroura (Hook.f. ex Benth.) Garn.-Jones
 Veronica stricta var. stricta

Uses
It is a pioneer plant useful to plant as a nurse crop for revegetation planting.

References

stricta
Flora of New Zealand
Plants used in traditional Māori medicine